Linda Strawberry is an American artist, director, editor and musician, best known for her work on tours and music videos.

Career
Initially working under her birth name Linda Rowberry, Strawberry collaborated with Especially For Youth on I Know My Redeemer Lives (2000) and with David Coverdale on Into the Light (2001)

She spent some time working as a recording engineer, most notably working on Sarah Mclachlan's Afterglow (2002) which has since sold over 4 million copies.

In, 2001 she performed with Djali Zwan (the second, acoustic incarnation of Corgan's Zwan project), appearing on the soundtrack to the movie Spun; she is the lead singer on the version of "Love to Love" from that soundtrack. Strawberry was signed to Chrysalis Records with a publishing development deal from 2004 to 2006.

She started her own label called Lovely Chaos Records, on which she released The Lost Record EP in August 2007, and Lip Distortion in 2009.

She has appeared on The Jimmy Chamberlin Complex album Life Begins Again, and on the soundtrack of 2002 movie Spun as well acting as an engineer on Sarah McLachlan's latest record. She has worked with Bjorn Thorsrud, Alan Moulder, Bon Harris. She sang a duet with David Coverdale on his 2001 solo record Into the Light. She appeared with Billy Corgan on the last Bozo the Clown Show. She was also active as a production assistant to the Zwan project.

August 2009 Strawberry joined Billy Corgan, Dave Navarro, Mark Tulin, Mike Byrne, Kerry Brown, Mark Weitz, Ysanne Spevack, and Kevin Dippold to do a tour under the band name Spirits in the Sky.

In 2011 she sang a duet with Curt Smith from Tears for Fears for a song by The Shadow Bureau titled "Don't Give Yourself Away", and was responsible for some of the artwork for Peter Murphy's video of "I Spit Roses."

Strawberry co-wrote and produced a song "Dancing in the Sunshine" for Disney television show Phineas and Ferb for the episode "Just My Luck".

In 2012 she began working as a producer, video director, editor, and colorist. Some of her work includes Kat Von D "I Am Nothing" Director, Production Designer, Editor, Colorist, Peter Murphy "I Spit Roses" Illustrator, Smashing Pumpkins "Cyr" Director/Editor, and AFI "Tied To A Tree" Director/Editor.

In 2017 she co-directed and edited a 41 minute psychedelic silent art film titled Pillbox accompanying Billy Corgan's record Ogilala. Later that year she also directed a live solo performance of Corgan playing songs from Ogilala and Smashing Pumpkins that was released under the title 'Neath the Darkest Eves'.

Live Concert Work

In 2018 Strawberry was brought on as Creative Director for the Smashing Pumpkins Shiny And Oh So Bright Tour, and the 30th Anniversary Series Mini-Tour.

In 2019 she was Creative Director for Smashing Pumpkins European and North American tours, featuring 31 foot tall Bauhaus Movement inspired puppets.

Also in 2019, she provided live visual content and creative direction for Bon Jovi This House is Not For Sale European Tour.

In 2021 she created video content for the Green Day song "She" for the Hella Mega Tour.

2022 she was brought on to create tour visuals and provide creative direction for Deftones, Cardi B, Lizzo, Maxwell, and Smashing Pumpkins.

Solo discography
2007: The Lost Record
2009: Lip Distortion

Filmography

"Pillbox" co-directed with Billy Corgan (2017)
"'Neath the Darkest Eves" a solo performance by Billy Corgan

Music videos

2012: "I Spit Roses" - Peter Murphy - Illustration
2015: "Run 2 Me" - Smashing Pumpkins - Production, Editing, Direction, VFX
2016: "Gentrification Blues" - David J - Production, Editing, Direction, VFX
2017: "The Spaniards" - William Patrick Corgan - Production, Editing, Direction, VFX
2018: "Silvery Sometimes" - Smashing Pumpkins - Production, Editing, Creative Direction
2020: "CYR" - Smashing Pumpkins - Production, Editing, Direction, VFX
2020: "Ramona" - Smashing Pumpkins - Production, Editing, Direction, VFX
2021: "What's Coming To Me" - Dorothy - Production, Editing, Direction, VFX
2021: "Tied To A Tree" - AFI - Production, Editing, Direction, VFX
2021: "I Am Nothing" - Kat Von D - Production, Production Design, Editing, Direction, VFX
2021: "Enough" - Kat Von D - Editing, Color, VFX
2022: "Beguiled" - Smashing Pumpkins - Director, Production Design, Styling
2022: "Rest In Peace - Dorothy - Editing, Color Grading

References

External links

1981 births
American keyboardists
American women rock singers
American music video directors
Female music video directors
Living people
The Smashing Pumpkins
21st-century American women singers
21st-century American singers